Times-Shamrock Communications is an American media company based in Scranton, Pennsylvania. The company, owned by the Lynett and Haggerty families of Scranton, lists among its assets four daily newspapers, six weekly newspapers, and nine radio stations. Most of its properties are in Northeastern Pennsylvania.

Assets

Daily newspapers
 The Times-Tribune, Scranton, Pennsylvania
 The Citizens' Voice, Wilkes-Barre, Pennsylvania
 The Standard-Speaker, Hazleton, Pennsylvania
 The Republican & Herald, Pottsville, Pennsylvania

Weekly newspapers
 The Abington Suburban
 The Triboro Banner
 The Valley Advantage
 The Pocono Times
 Wyoming County Press Examiner, Tunkhannock, Pennsylvania
 Ithaca & Tri-Village Pennysaver

Alternative weeklies
 Electric City, Scranton, Pennsylvania
 Diamond City, Wilkes-Barre, Pennsylvania

Radio stations
 WZBA, Baltimore, Maryland (city of license: Westminster, MD)
 WEJL Scranton, Pennsylvania
 WEZX/WPZX/WFUZ Scranton, Pennsylvania
 WQFM/WQFN Scranton, Pennsylvania
 WLDB, Milwaukee, Wisconsin
 WLUM, Milwaukee, Wisconsin
 WZTI, Milwaukee, Wisconsin

The Milwaukee radio stations are operated by Milwaukee Radio Alliance, a partnership between Shamrock Communications, Times-Shamrock's broadcasting affiliate, and Willie Davis's All-Pro Broadcasting, Inc. Davis died on April 15, 2020, leaving his estate as the partner in the MRA.

In January 2008, Times-Shamrock Communications launched the570.com, a regional entertainment portal covering the 570 area code.

Former properties
In August 2013, Times-Shamrock announced it would divest several of its properties in order to focus the company on northeastern Pennsylvania. The divested properties:
 Baltimore City Paper (purchased by the Baltimore Sun Media Group)
 Cleveland Scene (purchased by Euclid Media Group)
 Detroit Metro Times (purchased by Euclid Media Group)
 Orlando Weekly (purchased by Euclid Media Group)
 San Antonio Current (purchased by Euclid Media Group)
 Virgin Islands Daily News (sold to Virgin Islands businessman Archie Nahigian) 
 The Progress-Index (purchased by GateHouse Media)

In October 2015, Times-Shamrock announced another major divestment of several newspaper properties. The divested properties were all part of the Towanda Printing Company business segment. Sample News Group, of Huntingdon, Pennsylvania, acquired the properties. Also included in the sale was the Towanda Printing Company printing facility. The divested properties include:
 The Daily Review (Towanda, Pennsylvania)
 The News-Item (Shamokin, Pennsylvania)
 Bradford-Sullivan Pennysaver (Towanda, Pennsylvania)
 The Citizen-Standard (Valley View, Pennsylvania)
 The Farmer's Friend (Towanda, Pennsylvania)
 The Northeast Driller (Sayre, Pennsylvania)
 The Oswego Pennysaver (Oswego, Pennsylvania)
 Susquehanna County Independent (Montrose, Pennsylvania)
 The Troy Pennysaver (Troy, Pennsylvania)
 The Weekender (Montrose, Pennsylvania)

In July 2017, it was announced that Times-Shamrock is selling its radio stations in the Reno, Nevada, market to Entravision. KRZQ wasn't included in the sale, as it was sold to John Burkavage's Bighorn Media.

The affected stations were:
 KRZQ, Reno, Nevada (city of license: Fallon, Nevada)
 KZTI, Reno, Nevada (city of license: Fallon Station, Nevada)
 KWNZ, Lovelock, Nevada
 KNEZ, Fernley, Nevada

References

External links
 Times-Shamrock Communications
 Milwaukee Radio Alliance

Mass media companies of the United States
Companies based in Lackawanna County, Pennsylvania
Companies with year of establishment missing
Privately held companies based in Pennsylvania
Radio broadcasting companies of the United States